Tomáš Kraus (born 3 March 1974, in Děčín) is a Czech sportsman who has specialized in both alpine skiing and freestyle skiing. His best results as an alpine skier was two 28th places at the 1997 and 2003 World Championships, but as a freestyle skier he is a double world champion and has 15 victories in World Cup races in the skicross discipline.

Freestyle skiing
Before retiring as an alpine skier, Kraus had already taken up ski cross. He made his World Cup debut in November 2002 in Tignes, and won that race, but only competed in two more races that season. He opened the 2003–04 season with an eighth place in Saas-Fee, and recorded a fourth place from Pozza di Fassa in January as his best result. In the 2004–05 season he competed in six World Cup races, winning three of them; in Les Contamines, Pozza di Fassa and Kreischberg. At the end of the season he won the gold medal at the 2005 World Championships in Ruka.

Kraus opened the 2005–06 season with a victory in Les Contamines, and followed up with victories in Kreischberg and Sierra Nevada. His worst result that season was a fourth place. He continued his form in the 2006–07 season. Albeit only competing three times, with two second places and one third place, he won another gold medal at the 2007 World Championships in Madonna di Campiglio. In 2007–08 he won four out of his first five races, his worst result being a fifth place. In 2008–09 he opened with two fifth places, but then won the race in Flaine in January.

Kraus represents the sports club USK Praha. He has used Fischer skis during his freestyle career, and Dynastar during his alpine career.

References

1974 births
Living people
Czech male alpine skiers
Czech male freestyle skiers
Freestyle skiers at the 2010 Winter Olympics
Freestyle skiers at the 2014 Winter Olympics
Olympic freestyle skiers of the Czech Republic
Universiade medalists in alpine skiing
People from Děčín
Universiade silver medalists for the Czech Republic
Competitors at the 1999 Winter Universiade
Sportspeople from the Ústí nad Labem Region